General elections were held in Antigua and Barbuda on 1 November 1956. The Antigua Labour Party retained all 8 seats and the party's leader Vere Bird became Minister of Trade and Production after a ministerial system of government was established. Voter turnout was 57.0%.

Results

References

Elections in Antigua and Barbuda
Antigua
1956 in Antigua and Barbuda
Landslide victories
November 1956 events in North America